Alf's Button is a 1930 British comedy film directed by W. P. Kellino and starring Tubby Edlin, Alf Goddard and Nora Swinburne. It is an adaptation of the 1920 novel Alf's Button by William Aubrey Darlington. The film features some singing and dancing sequences in an early colour process, which is believed to be Pathécolor.

Premise
A Cockney soldier discovers that a button on his uniform was made from Aladdin's lamp. When rubbed, the button grants wishes.

Cast
 Tubby Edlin as Alf Higgins
 Alf Goddard as Bill Grant
 Nora Swinburne as Lady Isobel Fitzpeter
 Polly Ward as Liz
 Humberston Wright as Eustace the genie
 Annie Esmond as Mrs. Gaskins
 Gypsy Rhouma as Lucy
 Peter Haddon as Lieutenant Allen
 Cyril McLaglen as Sergeant Major
 Bruce Winston as Mustapha
 Spencer Trevor as Lord Dunwater
 Anton Dolin
 Merle Oberon
 Jimmy Nervo
 Teddy Knox

Preservation status
This film is believed to be held at the British Film Institute in London.

See also
Alf's Button (1920)
List of early color feature films

References

Bibliography
David R. Sutton, A Chorus of Raspberries: British Film Comedy 1929–1939 (University of Exeter Press, 2000)

External links

1930 films
1930 comedy films
1930s color films
1930 lost films
British comedy films
1930s English-language films
Films directed by W. P. Kellino
Films based on British novels
Films shot at Lime Grove Studios
Gainsborough Pictures films
British black-and-white films
Remakes of British films
Sound film remakes of silent films
Lost British films
Works based on Aladdin
Lost comedy films
1930s British films